Van Straelen is a Belgium surname. Notable people with this name: 

 Georges Van Straelen (1956–2012), French footballer and coach
 Robert Van Straelen (b. 1934), Belgium Emeritus Professor at Antwerp Management School
 Victor van Straelen (1889–1964), Belgian conservationist, palaeontologist and carcinologist

Surnames
Surnames of Dutch origin